Lobbo is a Malian surname. Notable people with the surname include:

 Ba Lobbo, nineteenth century Malian imam
 Shaykhu Ahmadu ibn Muhammadu Lobbo (1773–1845), Malian imam

See also
 Löbbo
 Lobo (disambiguation)

Surnames of African origin